Joinville Island is the largest island of the Joinville Island group, about  long in an east-west direction and  wide, lying off the northeastern tip of the Antarctic Peninsula, from which it is separated by the Antarctic Sound. Joinville Island was discovered and charted roughly during 1838 by a French expedition commanded by Captain Jules Dumont d'Urville, who named it for Prince François, Prince of Joinville (1818–1900), the third son of Louis-Philippe, Duke of Orléans. It is within the Argentine, British and Chilean Antarctic claims.

Geography
Joinville Island consists of a series of valleys and bays, including Suspiros Bay and Balaena Valley.

See also 
 Composite Antarctic Gazetteer
 List of Antarctic and sub-Antarctic islands
 List of Antarctic islands south of 60° S
 SCAR
 Territorial claims in Antarctica
 Williwaw Rocks

References

Islands of the Joinville Island group